Abrosovo is a rural locality (a village) in Kromskoye Rural Settlement of Verkhnelandekhovsky District, Ivanovo Oblast, Russia. The population was 14 as of 2010.

Geography 
Abrosovo is located 18 km west of Verkhny Landekh (the district's administrative centre) by road. Yefremovo is the nearest rural locality.

References 

Rural localities in Ivanovo Oblast